Daniel Thomas Drew (born 1979) is an American politician from Connecticut and the former mayor of Middletown, Connecticut. Drew was elected mayor in 2011 and was re-elected in 2013 and 2015. He is a member of the Democratic Party.

In July 2017, Drew announced his candidacy for Governor of Connecticut, withdrawing from the race in January 2018.

Early life and education 
Dan Drew was born in New York City and was raised in New York and Connecticut.

At age 18, Drew volunteered as an EMT in Connecticut.

He attended the University of Connecticut (UConn) where he served as the editor-in-chief of The Daily Campus student newspaper, graduating in 2002 with a bachelor's degree in political science.  On May 3, 2002, while still a UConn student Drew appeared on the Fox News television show The O'Reilly Factor and defended a fellow student's right to free speech despite the controversial content of the student's student-activity-fee-funded TV show.

In 2015, Drew graduated from Columbia University with a master's degree in organizational psychology.

Political career 

In 2009, Drew ran against incumbent mayor Sebastian Giuliano and lost 52–47%. He ran again in 2011, defeating Giuliano 53-46%. Facing no major party opponent, Drew was re-elected in 2013 with over 80 percent of the vote. In 2015, he was elected to a four-year term as Middletown voters approved an increase in the mayor's term.

In 2016, Drew made news when he donated a kidney to one of his constituents.

In 2018 Drew gave a TED talk at Wesleyan University on the misconceptions surrounding kidney donation.  

On January 12, 2017, Drew announced he was forming an exploratory committee to run for Governor of Connecticut.

On July 12, 2017, Drew announced that he was running for Governor of Connecticut in the 2018 election. He withdrew from the race on January 12, 2018, exactly one year after forming an exploratory committee to run, stating that, "Ultimately it became very difficult to raise the required funds to qualify for public financing."

In 2019 Drew was named Co-Chair of the Board of Connecticut DonateLife.

Electoral history

References

External links 
 Campaign website
 Official page at City of Middletown
Wesleyan Newsletter Blog

1979 births
21st-century American politicians
Teachers College, Columbia University alumni
Connecticut Democrats
Living people
Mayors of Middletown, Connecticut
University of Connecticut alumni